Robert Lipscomb (28 February 1837 – 8 January 1895) was an English amateur cricketer. He played 60 first-class cricket matches, mostly for Kent County Cricket Club, between 1862 and 1873.

Early life
Lipscomb was born at Penshurst in Kent, the son of Robert and Elizabeth Lipscomb. His father was a farmer and, after being educated at Rocky Hill House School in Maidstone, Lipscomb followed in his father's footsteps and farmed for much of his life, initially at East Peckham. He suffered financially during the agricultural depression of the 1870s and later worked as a hop factor at Leigh.

Cricket
As a cricketer, Lipscomb was a fast bowler, playing as an amateur when his work allowed him to. He has been described as a "valuable addition" to the Kent bowling attack who often played at his best during Canterbury Cricket Week, the social highlight of the county's cricketing year. A well-built man, Lord Harris described him as the "fiercest of bowlers" and Lipscomb took 206 wickets in his 48 first-class matches for Kent. His Wisden obituary described him as "one of the fastest and straightest amateur fast bowlers of his day".

After impressing whilst playing for Town Malling, Lipscomb's first-class debut was for Kent against an England XI during the 1862 Canterbury Cricket Week. He played first-class cricket in every season until 1873, making a total of 60 appearances. Other than the county side, he played for the Gentlemen of Kent as well as other amateur sides. His best bowling performance came in 1871 against MCC at Lord's when he took nine wickets for the cost of 88 runs (9/88), including bowling six batsmen.

Family and later life
Lipscomb married Lucy Richmond in 1859; the couple had five children. One of their sons, Frank Lipscomb, played first-class cricket, mainly as a fast bowler for Kent in the 1880s before emigrating to Australia.

Lipscomb served on the General Committee at Kent between 1871 and 1877. He died at Tudeley Hale in Kent in 1895, aged 57.

References

External links
 

1837 births
1895 deaths
English cricketers
Kent cricketers
People from Penshurst
Sportspeople from Kent
Gentlemen of Kent cricketers
Gentlemen of the South cricketers
Gentlemen cricketers
North of the Thames v South of the Thames cricketers